Oil Creek is a stream in Perry County, Indiana, in the United States. It is a tributary of the Ohio River.

Oil Creek was named for traces of oil along its banks.

See also
List of rivers of Indiana

References

Rivers of Perry County, Indiana
Rivers of Indiana